Felony 11-79, known in Japan as , is a video game developed by Climax and published by Yanoman and ASCII for the PlayStation in 1997. It was part of a late 1990s wave of driving games which encourage the player to create chaos and destruction, being preceded by Die Hard Trilogy and Carmageddon. A sequel to the game, called Super Runabout: San Francisco Edition, was released in 2000.

Gameplay
The first game in the Runabout series was known outside Asia as Felony 11–79 and was designed and produced by Kan Naito. It features three separate environments (Down Town, Sea Side, Metro City) and a test course as opposed to the later games' use of one city. Most of the player's time is spent unlocking the game's many bonus vehicles. Players can set the car's performance, including steering, front suspension, rear suspension, grip balance, acceleration and brake. Each car has a different performance rate (horsepower, torque, length, weight, fuel). Players may need to refill the tank.

Development
Though Climax were primarily developing games for the Sega Saturn at the time, they concluded Runabout would be easier to produce on the PlayStation.

Reception

The game received above-average reviews according to the review aggregation website GameRankings. In Japan, Famitsu gave it a score of 30 out of 40.

Critics almost unanimously commented that while the game has an enjoyable concept, the game is too lacking in longevity to be worth buying. Shawn Smith of Electronic Gaming Monthly argued that the game has plenty of replay value in the form of numerous unlockable cars, two unlockable tracks, and hidden routes, but the vast majority of reviewers (including all three of Smith's co-reviewers) pointed out that one can unlock all the tracks, play through the entire game with all the basic vehicle types, and explore all the routes in just two to five hours, and said they would rather have more tracks than the 20 unlockable cars. GamePro summarized the game as "a must-rent".

Some reviewers also complained at the fact that it is impossible to run over pedestrians, and Next Generation criticized that the story's ending is disappointingly brief and trite, given that Climax were known for their involved and original storylines. GameSpot and GamePro both praised the surf-rock soundtrack.

Notes

References

External links
 

1997 video games
ASCII Corporation games
PlayStation (console) games
PlayStation (console)-only games
Racing video games
Video games developed in Japan